Janusz Roman Grabowski (born April 30, 1955 in Stalowa Wola, Poland) Polish mathematician working in differential geometry and mathematical methods in classical and quantum physics.

Scientific career 
Grabowski earned his MSc degree in mathematics in 1978 at the Faculty of Mathematics, Informatics and Mechanics of the University of Warsaw. His master thesis was awarded the prize of Polish Mathematical Society. In the period of 1978-2001 he worked at the University of Warsaw earning his PhD in 1982 and habilitation in 1993. From 2001 he works in Institute of Mathematics Polish Academy of Sciences as a full professor. In 1988 and 1989 he was a fellow of Alexander von Humboldt Foundation. After political changes in Eastern Europe in 1989 he started an intensive international collaboration. He worked as visiting professor in many European scientific institutions, e.g. Erwin Schroedinger Institute in Vienna, University of Naples, University of Luxembourg and several Spanish universities. He acted also as an expert, panel member and panel chief in European Research Council. He supervised four PhD students.

Scientific activity 
The main idea of research activities of Janusz Grabowski is that one should try to find ‘the correct' framework, in which the considered problem really simplifies. Main results of his work include:
 Showing that k-tuple vector bundles can be characterized as manifolds equipped with k vector bundle structures with commuting Euler vector fields.
 Introducing the concept of a graded bundle as a manifold with homogeneity structure, i.e. an action of multiplicative monoid of reals, together with its linearization.
 Defining general algebroid and Tulczyjew triple related to it. This concept was then used in analytical mechanics to describe systems with symmetries and constraints, possibly nonholonomic.
 Introducing the concept of Jacobi algebroid and Jacobi-Courant algebroid. In this approach Jacobi geometry is treated as homogeneous Poisson geometry.
 Results on isomorphisms of Lie algebras of vector fields.
 Geometrical approach to Lie systems of differential equations, i.e. systems of differential equations admitting a possibly nonlinear composition rule of solutions.
 Poison-Nijenhuis structures on Lie algebroids.
 Introducing the concept of a -supermanifold and results about its structure.
 Geometric approach to problems in quantum informatics and entanglement.

See also 
 differential geometry
 mathematical physics

References

External links 
  Janusz Grabowski in MathSciNet database (access 17-11-2016)
  Webpage of Janusz Grabowski (access 17-11-2016)
  Janusz Grabowski in Polska Bibliografia Naukowa database (access 17-11-2016)

1955 births
Living people
Polish mathematicians